Kurt or Kurd is a Turkish name and surname literally meaning "wolf".

 Ahmet Kurt Pasha, 18th Century Ottoman governor
 Elvira Kurt (Kürt Elvíra), Hungarian-born Canadian comedian
 Hamide Kurt (born 1993), Turkish female Paralympian athlete
 İpar Özay Kurt (born 2003), Turkey women's volleyball player
 Metin Kurt (1947-2012), Turkish footballer
 Kemal Kurt (1947-2002), Turkish author, translator and photographer
 Sabahudin Kurt (1935–2018), Bosnian singer
 Seyhan Kurt, French-Turkish poet, writer and sociologist
 Ümit Kurt (born 1991), Turkish footballer
 Yaşar Kurt (born 1968), Turkish rock artist
 Yeliz Kurt (born 1984), Turkish female middle distance runner

References

Turkish-language surnames
Hungarian-language surnames